The 1.Regionalliga is the fourth-tier level league of professional club basketball in Germany.

Structure
The league comprises 54 teams, separated into a 4-divisional structure wherein each regional structure consist of at least 14 teams. 

At the end of the league stage, the winning team of the playoffs in each division is eligible for promotion to the ProB, while the teams positioned in 9th place and lower fight in the play-downs to stay in the league. The bottom two placed teams of both divisions are relegated to the 2. Regionalliga.

Current teams (2021-22)
North

Notable players
To appear in this section a player must have played at least one season for the club OR either:
- Set a club or team record or won an individual award as a professional player.
- Played at least one official international match for his senior national team at any time. 
- Played at least one game for the NBA or any other professional leagues in various continents. 
 C. J. Carr
 Tyrell Sturdivant
 Jordan Talbert

Notable Coaches 
 Johannes Strasser

References 

Basketball leagues in Germany
Germany
Professional sports leagues in Germany